The men's 800m T54 had its first round held on September 11 at 11:34, its semifinals on September 12 at 21:00 and its final on September 13 at 21:03.

Medalists

Results

References

Round 1 - Heat 1
Round 1 - Heat 2
Round 1 - Heat 3
Round 1 - Heat 4
Semifinal - Heat 1
Semifinal - Heat 2
Final

Athletics at the 2008 Summer Paralympics